Nathaniel Robinson may refer to:
Nate Robinson (born 1984), American basketball player
Nate Robinson (American football) (born 1985), American football player
Nate Robinson (soccer) (born 1990), American soccer player
Nathaniel S. Robinson, Wisconsin legislator from Winnebago County, Wisconsin